WVOE (1590 AM) is a radio station broadcasting a Gospel music and Urban Adult Contemporary format. Licensed to Chadbourn, North Carolina in the United States. The station is owned by Ebony Enterprises. WVOE first signed on in 1962 and is the oldest African American owned radio station in the South.

In 2019, the building and equipment were in bad shape and few people were listening to AM radio. The station was in danger of going off the air but turned to GoFundMe to keep it going.

References

External links

VOE
Columbus County, North Carolina
Radio stations established in 1962
1962 establishments in North Carolina
VOE